Thakara is a 1979 Indian Malayalam-language drama film directed by Bharathan and written by Padmarajan. It stars Prathap Pothan, Surekha, Nedumudi Venu and K. G. Menon in pivotal roles. The film was a breakthrough in the career of Bharathan and Venu. It was remade in Tamil as Aavarampoo (1992).

Plot
Thakara (Prathap Pothan) is an orphan. He is mentally immature, but clean hearted. He has a close relationship with the fickling Subhashini (Surekha), the dream girl of the village, who often confuses men with her sexual teasing. Thakara was betrayed by the words of Chellappanashari (Nedumudi Venu) and indulges in a physical relationship with Subhashini. Subhashini's father Mathu Mooppan (K. G. Menon) finds out their relation and beats Thakara unconscious and injures him severely. Thakara, fully filled with revenge on Mooppan, runs away. Once he earns enough money to buy a knife, he returns and kills Mooppan. Subhashini refuses to go with Thakara, who proposes to her after killing her father. With no way to escape, Thakara finds his end in front of a running train.

Cast 
Prathap Pothan as Thakara
Surekha as Subhashini (Voice dubbed by KPAC Lalitha)
Nedumudi Venu as Chellappanasari
K. G. Menon as Mooppan
Anirudhan as Pullai
 Sreelatha Namboothiri as Kamakshi
Santha Devi as Subhashini's mother

Production
Initially, writer Padmarajan chose Bharat Gopy for the role of Maathu Mooppan, but he declined the offer saying he is not interested in doing "commercial films". Later, they had a discussion on the matter a day before the shooting of Padmarajan's Peruvazhiyambalam on which Gopy agreed to act on his insistence, after that meeting Gopy changed his views and began appearing in mainstream films as well. In his book Abhinayam Anubhavam published in 1994, Gopy recalls that, it was Padmarajan, who is younger than me, made me realise that there is no commercial or art film, but only good and bad films.

Soundtrack
The music was composed by M. G. Radhakrishnan and the lyrics were written by Poovachal Khader.

Awards
Filmfare Award for Best Film - Malayalam won by V.V. Babu (1979)

References

External links 
 

1979 films
1970s Malayalam-language films
Films with screenplays by Padmarajan
Films directed by Bharathan
Films scored by M. G. Radhakrishnan
Malayalam films remade in other languages